The World Cup Waterloo is a cyclo-cross race held in Waterloo, Iowa in the United States, which is since 2017 part of the UCI Cyclo-cross World Cup.

Past winners

Men

Women

References
 Results

UCI Cyclo-cross World Cup
Cycle races in the United States
Cyclo-cross races